Kolíňany is a village and municipality in the Nitra District in western central Slovakia, in the Nitra Region.

History
In historical records the village was first mentioned in 1113.

Geography
The village lies at an altitude of 245 metres and covers an area of 12.501 km². It has a population 1570 people (cenzus 2011).

Ethnicity
According to the 2021 census, out of 1,551 inhabitants there were 880 (56,74 %) Slovaks, 611 (39,39 %) Hungarians and 60 (3,87 %) others.

Facilities
The village has a public library a gym and football pitch.

See also
 List of municipalities and towns in Slovakia

References

Genealogical resources

The records for genealogical research are available at the state archive "Statny Archiv in Nitra, Slovakia"

 Roman Catholic church records (births/marriages/deaths): 1780-1894 (parish A)

External links
https://web.archive.org/web/20090412234949/http://www.statistics.sk/mosmis/eng/run.html
Surnames of living people in Kolinany

Villages and municipalities in Nitra District